Peel were a band formed by former Ridel High singer Kevin Ridel in 1999 after the breakup of Ridel High. Ridel recruited Steve LeRoy of Ridel High on guitar, Matt Fuller later replaced Steve LeRoy on guitar and finally Joe Higgins (AM Radio) on drums.  Peel recorded and released one album titled Blindside produced by Face to Face singer Trever Keith, track 6 on the album "Facelift" was previously released as a Ridel High song on the 2000 compilation CD Happy Meals 2 Blindside was recorded in tribute Kevin's dad, Gerald “Jerry” Ridel.

Peel were active until 2001, Kevin Ridel then took Joe Higgins with him and went on to form AM Radio in 2001 who remain active until this very day.

Discography

Peels only album was the 1999 recorded "Blindside".

Blindside - 1999
 1. Set 'em Up 2:44
 2. Summer Song 3:36
 3. Grounded 3:56
 4. Birthday Present 3:56
 5. Gel 4:47
 6. Facelift 2:21
 7. Overlife 4:39
 8. Day To Day 4:44
 9. Nightmares 3:25
 10. Angel On My Shoulder 2:33
 11.Silence Is Deadly 3:56
 12.Blindside 3:07

Personnel

Band members

1999-2001 Lineup

 Kevin Ridel – bass, lead vocals
 Steve LeRoy – guitar
 Steve Coulter - drums
 Matt Fuller (2001) - guitar

External links
 Blindside on CDBaby
 Blindside on itunes

References

1999 establishments in California
Musical groups established in 1999
Musical groups from Los Angeles